Mason Teague (born 13 July 2003) is an Australian professional rugby league footballer who plays as a  for the Dolphins in the NRL.

Background 
Teague was born in Wagga Wagga, New South Wales and is of Fijian descent. He attended St Dominic's College, Penrith. He was playing in Penrith Panthers’ under-19s team in NSW Rugby League’s S. G. Ball Cup competition when he was signed by the Dolphins on a three-year deal.

Playing career

Club career
Teague was contracted to the Penrith Panthers as a junior coming through the ranks, before signing with the Dolphins for their inaugural 2023 NRL season. 

In round 2 of the 2023 NRL season, Teague made his first grade debut for the Dolphins in place of the injured Ray Stone in his side's 20−14 victory over the Canberra Raiders at Dolphin Stadium.

References

External links 
 Dolphins profile

2003 births
Living people
Australian rugby league players
Australian people of Fijian descent
Dolphins (NRL) players
Rugby league locks